Farshad Majedi (born 11 March 1979) is a former Iranian footballer, and Mirshad Majedi′s younger brother. He played in Payam Tehran F.C., Pas F.C., Maharat Semnan and Iran national football team in youth level.

Management career
He started his coaching career with Payam Tehran F.C. for four years and joined Iran national football team youth level later. He continued with Iran national under-23 football team

Player career 

 Payam (Youth)
 Tejarat (Youth)
 Keshavarz (Youth)
 Pas Tehran ( for 5 Years )
 TOT Thailand

Retirement 
Farshad Majedi couldn't playe football after Traumatic brain injury (TBI) and started to participate in Coaching Courses

References

External links
فرشاد ماجدى:تورنمنت قطر تمرين رويارويى با حريفان اصلى است

1979 births
Living people
Iranian footballers
Iranian football managers
Association football midfielders
Sportspeople from Tehran